Bebo's Girl may refer to:

 Bébo's Girl, the title of the English translation of Carlo Cassola's 1960 novel La ragazza di Bube
 La ragazza di Bube (film), the title of the American release, with English subtitles, of the Italian film adapted from the novel